Mirko Palazzi (born 21 March 1987) is a Sammarinese footballer who plays for Cattolica Calcio.

Career
Born in Rimini, Emilia–Romagna, Italy to an Italian father and a Sanmarinese mother, Palazzi started his career at hometown club Rimini. At Rimini he also capped for San Marino, a city state bordering Marche and Romagna region, in the last two matches of 2006 FIFA World Cup qualification (UEFA), as well as a game in UEFA Euro 2008 qualifying. However Palazzi only played once in 2006–07 Serie C2. Palazzi then played 2 seasons in Serie D for Verucchio, a local side within the Province of Rimini. Palazzi played for Sanmarinese amateur club Tre Penne. He scored two goals in 2010–11 UEFA Europa League before returned to Rimini for the re-established Rimini: A.C. Rimini 1912 which the new entity was admitted Serie D after the old entity was expelled from Lega Pro. A.C. Rimini was promoted in that season as the winner of inter-group promotion playoffs.

Ahead of the 2019/20 season, Palazzi joined Italian club AS San Giovanni Marignanese.

International career

International goals
Scores and results list San Marino's goal tally first.

References

External links
 
 Football.it Profile 

1987 births
Living people
Sportspeople from Rimini
Sammarinese footballers
San Marino international footballers
Rimini F.C. 1912 players
A.C. Bellaria Igea Marina players
Association football midfielders
Sammarinese people of Italian descent
Italian people of Sammarinese descent
S.P. Tre Penne players
Footballers from Emilia-Romagna